Miia-Maarit Niemi (born 9 July 1983) is a Finnish former footballer who played in the Norwegian Toppserien for Amazon Grimstad and Klepp IL, as well as HJK in her home country. After making her debut for the Finland women's national football team in 2003, Niemi accrued 46 caps and played at UEFA Women's Euro 2009.

Club career

A versatile defender, Niemi won two Naisten Liiga titles with HJK in 2001 and 2005, as well as a Naisten Cup in 2002. She was also part of the HJK team which reached the semi-finals of the inaugural UEFA Women's Cup in 2001–02.

Having moved to Norway for the 2008 season, Niemi played for Amazon Grimstad then retired after an injury-disrupted final season with Klepp IL in 2011.

International career

She made her debut for the senior Finland team on 9 March 2003; playing 17 minutes as a substitute against Sweden in Eskilstuna. Niemi was left out of the squad for UEFA Women's Euro 2005, but featured in one of Finland's matches at UEFA Women's Euro 2009, a 1–0 defeat to Ukraine.

Niemi's final appearances for the national team came at the 2010 Algarve Cup, versus Denmark.

References

External links

Profile at Football Association of Finland 

Engaged to Rolf Manuel Nese Skadsem

1983 births
Living people
Finnish women's footballers
Finland women's international footballers
Helsingin Jalkapalloklubi (women) players
Kansallinen Liiga players
Expatriate women's footballers in Norway
Finnish expatriate footballers
Finnish expatriate sportspeople in Norway
Toppserien players
Women's association football defenders